William Ryan Johnson (born October 10, 1986) is an American professional sports car and stock car racing driver. He is the 2016 IMSA Continental Tire Sports Car Challenge GS champion.  He currently competes part-time in the WeatherTech SportsCar Championship and FIA World Endurance Championship, driving for Ford Chip Ganassi Racing UK in the No. 66 Ford GT.

Racing career

Early career
When he was 13 years old, Johnson started kart racing. In 2003 he won a scholarship to race in the series Skip Barber Racing School and a scholarship in Valencia Spain to compete in the inaugural season of Formula BMW USA as a Factory BMW "Junior" driver.

In 2004 he competed in the Formula BMW USA Championship and finished 5th and received the Sportsman of the Year award.

In 2005 he finished in the top-10 of his one and only Star Mazda Pro Series race.

Sports cars
In 2005 he made his sports car debut with Speed Source co-driving with James Hinchcliffe in the Grand-Am Cup ST class, en route to 7 top-10 finishes in 7 races. He also made his GT car debut in the Virginia round of the Rolex Sports Car Series with Team Prototype Technology Group in a BMW M3. and had 7 top-10 finishes in the Grand-Am Cup ST class driving for SpeedSource, Matt Connolly Motorsports, and Compass 360.

In 2006 he competed in one Speed World Challenge race for Tindol Motorsports as well as the Grand-Am Cup ST class for Kensai Racing, Potter Racing, and ROAR Racing.

2007 was his first full season in sports cars, finishing 2nd in the ST Championship with 3 victories under Kensai Racing.  He also made his Koni Challenge GS class debut thanks to Jim Click Racing, finishing 6th as the highest placing Mustang.

In 2008, he made the progression to a full season in the GS class under Motorsport Technology Group with 4 podium finishes driving a BMW Z4 M-Coupe and Porsche 997.

In 2009, after winning at Homestead in a Porsche 997 for Motorsport Technology Group, and the team running out of funds halfway through the season, he signed with Roush Fenway Racing's Koni Challenge team, driving a Ford Mustang FR500C alongside Jack Roush Jr. A year later, the two won at Homestead-Miami Speedway, Jack Roush's 400th win as a car owner.  They finished 3rd in the championship with a win at New Jersey and multiple podiums.

In late 2011 they finished 2nd in the championship with 3 victories, at VIR, Watkins Glen, and New Jersey.  That year he also joined Turner Motorsport to drive a BMW M3 at the Rolex Sports Car Series, finishing fourth at Montreal.

In 2012 he made his Rolex Daytona Prototype debut with Doran Racing Sunday morning after illness and injury left the team short on drivers mid-race and Johnson filling in having never driven a Prototype.  Driving for Roush, he claimed wins at Daytona and Mid-Ohio, and a podium finish in a one-off ST race at Lime Rock and a top-5 driving a BMW M3 for RumBum Racing.

In 2013 he made his American LeMans Series Debut driving for Aston Martin Racing in the 2013 12 Hours of Sebring, finishing ninth. He won at Daytona and Lime Rock in the Continental Tire Sports Car Challenge GS class and had a podium finish at Laguna Seca in the Turner Motorsports BMW M3 in the GT class.

In 2014 he switched to Multimatic Motorsports in the Continental Tire Sports Car Challenge series driving the Boss 302R with Ian James winning the season finale at Road Atlanta.  He also drove for Scuderia Corsa in the Ferrari 458 in the GTD class in the 24 Hours of Daytona with Ken Wilden, Dave Empringham, and Rod Randall.

In 2015 he drove with Scott Maxwell in the Boss 302R and debut the Ford Shelby GT350R-C, finishing 3rd in the Championship and winning at Lime Rock.  He returned with Turner to drive a BMW Z4 at Petit Le Mans.

In 2016, he joined Chip Ganassi Racing's FIA World Endurance Championship team, driving the No. 66 Ford GT in the first three races of the season, including the 24 Hours of Le Mans; sharing the car with Olivier Pla and Stefan Mücke, he was the only American to race for Ford in the series that year.  They finished 4th at LeMans.

He won the 2016 Continental Tire Sports Car Challenge Championship in the Ford Shelby GT350R-C with Scott Maxwell, winning 6 races that year - Daytona, Mosport, Lime Rock, Road America, COTA, and Road Atlanta.

He returned to run the 2018–19 FIA World Endurance Championship, and won the opening race at Spa.

Testing and coaching
Johnson has been involved as a test driver for Ford Motor Company and Multimatic Motorsports during the development of the GT350/R, 2016 Ford GT, Ford GT GTE/GTLM, Mustang GT4, FP350S, Mustang Performance Pack 2, and the new GT500. In addition to testing and development, he has also provided road racing training for Roush drivers Carl Edwards, Greg Biffle, Joey Logano, Brad Keselowski, Chris Buescher, Ricky Stenhouse, Darrell Wallace Jr., Aric Almirola.

NASCAR

In 2010, Johnson made his NASCAR Nationwide Series debut at Watkins Glen International, driving the No. 6 for Roush Fenway Racing as a road course ringer. Despite qualifying ninth, he was involved in a multi-car wreck on lap 24, finishing 36th.

Johnson returned to RFR in the 2011 Nationwide Series, this time at Road America, where he topped the time charts in the first practice  before qualifying on second row and running in the top 5 until falling out early due to an engine problem.

Running only one race in 2012, Johnson scored his first NASCAR top-ten finish at Circuit Gilles Villeneuve. After running in the top 5 most of the day, multiple Green-White-Checker attempts turned it into a fuel mileage race, and he had to pit for fuel on the second attempt from P2. On the third and final GWC restart, Johnson drove from 20th to 8th in two laps.

Coming off of that strong performance, Johnson led his first-ever laps at Road America in 2013. In that race, he started 7th and worked his way to the lead before a lap 14 pit road speeding penalty. He retook the lead again by lap 39 before being collected in a wreck at lap 47 while running 4th. He then made his first oval start at New Hampshire Motor Speedway, finishing both races in 15th place.

In 2017, Johnson joined Richard Petty Motorsports for his Monster Energy NASCAR Cup Series debut at Sonoma Raceway's Toyota/Save Mart 350, driving the No. 43 as a substitute for the injured Aric Almirola. After starting 26th, he finished 22nd.

Personal life
Johnson is of Japanese descent. He graduated from Cal State Fullerton where he majored in Business.

Motorsports career results

Sports car racing
(key)

Continental Tire SportsCar Challenge results

Complete FIA World Endurance Championship results
(key) (Races in bold indicate pole position; races in
italics indicate fastest lap)

* Season still in progress.

24 Hours of Le Mans results

NASCAR
(key) (Bold – Pole position awarded by qualifying time. Italics – Pole position earned by points standings or practice time. * – Most laps led.)

Monster Energy Cup Series

Nationwide Series

 Season still in progress
 Ineligible for series points

Complete British GT Championship results
(key) (Races in bold indicate pole position) (Races in italics indicate fastest lap)

References

External links

 
 

Living people
1986 births
Sportspeople from Torrance, California
Racing drivers from California
NASCAR drivers
American sportspeople of Japanese descent
24 Hours of Daytona drivers
24 Hours of Le Mans drivers
WeatherTech SportsCar Championship drivers
People from Torrance, California
FIA World Endurance Championship drivers
British GT Championship drivers
GT World Challenge America drivers
Multimatic Motorsports drivers
Chip Ganassi Racing drivers
RFK Racing drivers
Michelin Pilot Challenge drivers